Senator Irvin may refer to:

Alexander Irvin (1800–1874), Pennsylvania State Senate
Missy Irvin (born 1971), Arkansas State Senate

See also
James Irvine (Pennsylvania politician) (1735–1819), Pennsylvania State Senate
Senator Irwin (disambiguation)